Alexander Bravo (1797 – March 1868), sometimes spelled Alexandre Bravo, was a Jamaican-born Sephardic Jewish merchant, politician, slave plantation owner and Auditor-General of Jamaica. Bravo was the first Jew to be elected to the House of Assembly of Jamaica.

Biography
Alexandre Moses Bravo was born at Kingston, St. Andrew Parish, Jamaica to Moses Bravo (1758–1831), a Sephardic Jewish mechant and slave plantation owner in Jamaica (dealing with sugar cane and coffee) and his wife Abigail da Castro. Alexander Bravo was seated at a villa named Bravo Penn. He was a member of the Kingston Common Council and Custos of the parish of Clarendon. He had three brothers, including Charles Clement and Phineas Bravo.

According to the Legacies of British Slave-Ownership at the University College London, Bravo was awarded a payment as a slave trader in the aftermath of the Slavery Abolition Act 1833 with the Slave Compensation Act 1837. The British Government took out a £15 million loan (worth £ in ) with interest from Nathan Mayer Rothschild and Moses Montefiore which was subsequently paid off by the British taxpayers (ending in 2015). Bravo was associated with ten different claims,
the slave plantations mostly associated with Bravo was Knight's Estate at Vere, Marly Mount at St Dorothy and Mount Moses at Clarendon. Bravo owned 614 slaves in Jamaica and received a £13,157 payment at the time (worth £ in ).

Bravo was defeated at the January 1832 election for the Kingston Common Council by Price Watkins, the first coloured man to run for election to the council. According to Kathleen E. A. Monteith writing in Jamaica in Slavery and Freedom: History, Heritage and Culture (2001), the election results represented an alliance of free blacks and coloureds in alliance against Bravo; the result was 142 to Watkins, 92 to Bravo. In 1835, Bravo became the first Jew to be elected to the House of Assembly of Jamaica.

Personal life
Bravo was married to Sarah Nunes Henriques and had a number of children, including Moses (1825-1903), Alexandre Kelly (born 1829), Harriet Redware (1830-1920) and others.

See also
 History of the Jews in Jamaica

References

Footnotes

Bibliography

1797 births
1868 deaths
18th-century Sephardi Jews
19th-century Sephardi Jews
Jamaican planters
Jamaican politicians
Members of the House of Assembly of Jamaica
Jamaican Jews
British slave owners
Recipients of payments from the Slavery Abolition Act 1833